Hoh Fuk Tong is a stop on the MTR Light Rail network in Tuen Mun District, New Territories, Hong Kong. It is located at ground level at Castle Peak Road - San Hui next to CCC Hoh Fuk Tong College and Hoh Fuk Tong Centre.

Being part of Fare Zone 2 for single ride tickets, the stop serves CCC Hoh Fuk Tong College's vicinity and the southeastern part of San Hui.

History
Hoh Fuk Tong Stop commenced operation on 2 February 1992 along with the Tuen Mun Northeast Extension of Light Rail Transit.

The stop is named after Hoh Fuk Tong Centre and CCC Hoh Fuk Tong College, which are in turn named after Revd. Hoh Fuk Tong, the first ever Christian pastor of Chinese ethnicity in Hong Kong.

Hoh Fuk Tong Stop is the only Light Rail stop in Hong Kong named after an individual.

Rail service
Hoh Fuk Tong Stop is served by  route 614 and its short-working service 614P.

References

See also

Hoh Fuk Tong Centre

MTR Light Rail stops
Former Kowloon–Canton Railway stations
Tuen Mun District
Railway stations in Hong Kong opened in 1992
1992 establishments in Hong Kong